Qermez Khalifeh-ye Sofla (also Romanized as Qermez Khalīfeh-ye Soflá; also known as Qermez Khalīfeh) is a village in Zarrineh Rud Rural District, in the Central District of Miandoab County, West Azerbaijan Province, Iran. At the 2006 census, its population was 540, in 127 families.

References 

Populated places in Miandoab County